Gary Bert "Bones" Bromley (born January 19, 1950) is a Canadian former professional ice hockey goaltender.  He played in the National Hockey League (NHL) with the Buffalo Sabres and Vancouver Canucks.  He also played in the World Hockey Association (WHA) with the Calgary Cowboys and Winnipeg Jets.

In his NHL career, Bromley played in 136 games and accumulated a record of 54-44-28.  In the WHA, he played in 67 games, with a record of 31-21-3. He may be best remembered for his "Skull" mask which he wore during his years with the Canucks. The idea for the design came from his nickname, "Bones".

Career statistics

Regular season and playoffs

References

External links

Gary Bromley @ hockeygoalies.org

1950 births
Living people
Calgary Cowboys players
Buffalo Sabres players
Canadian expatriate ice hockey players in the United States
Canadian ice hockey goaltenders
Charlotte Checkers (EHL) players
Cincinnati Swords players
Dallas Black Hawks players
New Haven Nighthawks players
Providence Reds players
Regina Pats players
Ice hockey people from Edmonton
Undrafted National Hockey League players
Vancouver Canucks players
Winnipeg Jets (WHA) players